Nová Ves is a village and municipality in the Veľký Krtíš District of the Banská Bystrica Region of southern Slovakia.

Notes

External links
 

Villages and municipalities in Veľký Krtíš District